Amadej is a Polish coat of arms. It was used by several szlachta families in the times of the Kingdom of Poland and the Polish–Lithuanian Commonwealth.

Blazon
Gules an eagle displayed recursant argent armed and crowned or holding in its beak an annulet also or.  Crest: issuant out of a crest coronet or five ostrich feathers argent.  Mantled gules doubled argent.

See also
 Polish heraldry
 Heraldic family
 List of Polish nobility coats of arms

Bibliography
 Tadeusz Gajl: Herbarz polski od średniowiecza do XX wieku : ponad 4500 herbów szlacheckich 37 tysięcy nazwisk 55 tysięcy rodów. L&L, 2007. .

References

Amadej